Neocollyris andrewesi is a species of ground beetle in the genus Neocollyris in the family Carabidae. It was described by Horn in 1894.

It is named after the collector Henry Leslie Andrewes (1873–1946) who was a tea planter in the Nilgiris between 1899 and 1913 and a nephew of the entomologist Herbert Edwards Andrewes (1863-1950).

References

Andrewesi, Neocollyris
Beetles described in 1894
Taxa named by Walther Horn